This is the discography of Mint Condition.

Albums

Studio albums

Compilation albums

Live albums

Singles

References

Discographies of American artists